Samuel Lloyd Haynes (September 19, 1934 – December 31, 1986) was an American actor, best known for his starring role in the Emmy Award-winning series Room 222.

Biography
A native of South Bend, Indiana, Haynes served in the U.S. Marines from 1952 to 1964 and during the Korean War. He was a public affairs officer for the Naval Reserve with the rank of Commander and an alumnus of San Jose State University.

Following his military career, Haynes studied acting at the Film Industries Workshop and Actors West in Los Angeles. His film career included roles in Madigan (1968), Ice Station Zebra (1968), Assault on the Wayne (1971), Look What's Happened to Rosemary's Baby (1976), The Greatest (1977), and Good Guys Wear Black (1978). He also appeared in a number of television series, such as Batman and the miniseries 79 Park Avenue (1977). He played Communications Officer Alden in the second Star Trek pilot episode "Where No Man Has Gone Before" (1965), but was replaced by Nichelle Nichols as Lt. Uhura when the series went into production the following year.

Haynes also appeared on television shows such as Hotel, The Green Hornet, The Fugitive, The FBI, Marcus Welby, M.D., and Emergency!, as Captain Stone of Los Angeles County Fire Station 8 in the fourth episode of its fifth season (1975-1976) called "Equipment".

He was best known as high school history teacher Pete Dixon in the comedy-drama series  with Denise Nicholas, Michael Constantine, and Karen Valentine. Haynes and Valentine were both nominated for an Emmy and Golden Globe Award for their roles. Set at fictional  High School in a diverse area of Los Angeles, the show ran for five seasons on ABC, from 1969 to 1974, and was partially filmed

Death
Haynes died of lung cancer at age 52 in Coronado, California. He was survived by his third wife, Carolyn Inglis, and their 4-year-old daughter, Jessica Haynes. His Room 222 co-star, Denise Nicholas, was in attendance at Haynes' small private funeral in San Diego County. During his illness, Haynes was co-starring in the television soap opera General Hospital as Mayor Ken Morgan and was commuting from Coronado to Hollywood for filming, as he was working up until the time of his death.
He was buried at Eternal Hills Memorial Park in Oceanside, California.

Personal life
Haynes was an accomplished light airplane pilot, and developed a program to encourage and train minorities in aviation.

In 1970, after the first season of Room 222, Haynes divorced his wife of eleven years, Elizabeth. He married his second wife, Saundra Burge, the same year; they divorced in 1973. Haynes married again in March 1981, to Carolyn Inglis; together they had a daughter, Jessica Haynes.

Filmography

References

External links

 
 

1934 births
1987 deaths
American male film actors
American male television actors
American television writers
American male television writers
African-American Bahá'ís
Male actors from Indiana
Deaths from lung cancer in California
People from Coronado, California
Writers from South Bend, Indiana
United States Marines
African-American male actors
20th-century Bahá'ís
20th-century American male actors
Actors from South Bend, Indiana
Screenwriters from California
Screenwriters from Indiana
20th-century American screenwriters
United States Marine Corps personnel of the Korean War
United States Navy officers
United States Navy reservists
20th-century American male writers
20th-century African-American writers
Military personnel from California
African-American male writers